This article presents a list of the historical events and publications of Australian literature during 1989.

Events

 Peter Carey won the Miles Franklin Award for Oscar and Lucinda

Major publications

Novels 
 Mena Calthorpe, The Plain of Ala
 Bryce Courtenay, The Power of One
 Peter Goldsworthy, Maestro
 Elizabeth Jolley, My Father's Moon
 Mandy Sayer, Mood Indigo
 Amy Witting, I is for Isobel

Short story anthologies 
 Brian Matthews, Quickening and Other Stories

Children's and young adult fiction 
 Graeme Base, The Eleventh Hour
 Anna Fienberg, The Nine Lives of Balthazar
 Morris Gleitzman, Two Weeks with the Queen

Poetry 
 Robert Adamson (poet), The Clean Dark
 Dorothy Porter, Driving Too Fast
 Peter Skrzynecki, Night Swim

Poetry anthologies 

 Dorothy Hewett, A Tremendous World in her Head: Selected Poems

Drama 
 Nick Enright, Daylight Saving (play)
 Jenny Kemp (playwright), Call of the Wild
 Peta Murray
 Spitting Chips
 Wallflowering
 David Williamson, Top Silk

Non-fiction 
 Jill Ker Conway, The Road from Coorain
Elisabeth Wynhausen, Manly Girls

Awards and honours
Mary Durack , for "service to the community and literature"
Les Murray (poet) , for "service to Australian literature"
 Thomas Shapcott , for "service to Australian literature and to arts administration"
 Gwen Harwood , for "service to literature, particularly as a poet and librettist"
 Max Harris (poet) , for "service to literature"
 Clement Semmler , for "service to Australian literature"
 John Morrison (writer) , for "service to literature"

Births 
A list, ordered by date of birth (and, if the date is either unspecified or repeated, ordered alphabetically by surname) of births in 1989 of Australian literary figures, authors of written works or literature-related individuals follows, including year of death.
 2 June — Will Kostakis, author and journalist

Deaths 
A list, ordered by date of death (and, if the date is either unspecified or repeated, ordered alphabetically by surname) of deaths in 1989 of Australian literary figures, authors of written works or literature-related individuals follows, including year of birth.
 3 June – Connie Christie, children's writer/illustrator, photographer and commercial artist (born 1908 in England)

See also 
1989 in Australia
1989 in literature
 1989 in poetry
 List of years in literature
 List of years in Australian literature

References

1989 in Australia
Australian literature by year
20th-century Australian literature
1989 in literature